is a large, hilly park in northern Osaka.  It is most famous for its Open-Air Museum of Old Japanese Farmhouses, which contains examples of rural architecture from various parts of Japan.  It also contains tennis courts, bamboo gardens, ponds, playgrounds, flower gardens, a concert hall, a "flower road", a horseback riding track, and a "water world".

Hattori (服部) is the name of this region of the city, while ryokuchi (緑地) is a generic word for a green space, used for numerous other urban parks.

There was a YHA youth hostel in the park that closed at the end of August 2011.

Hydro park
There are recreational pools directly adjoining the public park in the south-west. Channelling of two rivers, between which rests the park, was developed into the current city waterworks, feeding both the park's ponds, the recreational (swimming) pools, and the fishing-pond separating the parks from the adjacent Temple.

Access 
The Midosuji subway line has a station to the east of the park. Get off at the Ryokuchi-kōen Station and walk west for about 5 minutes. Sone Station on the Hankyu Takarazuka line is also nearby, 15 minutes from the west entrance of the park.

References

Parks and gardens in Osaka